The Silver Slipper was a casino in Paradise, Nevada, that operated from September 1950 to November 29, 1988.  The building was designed by architect Martin Stern, Jr.

History
Opened in 1950, the casino was built on the grounds of the Last Frontier Village of the Hotel Last Frontier, and was originally named the Golden Slipper Saloon and Gambling Hall. The owner originally wanted to call it the Silver Slipper, but there already was an existing establishment with that name. The problem was solved when that small operation was purchased and closed, and the Golden Slipper became the Silver Slipper. The casino was known for its rotating slipper that sat atop the casino.

In April 1964, the casino became the first in Nevada to be shut down on cheating charges. Agents raided the Silver Slipper for using "flat" dice and for having other rigged games.

On April 30, 1968, the Silver Slipper was purchased by businessman Howard Hughes for $5.4 million in his famous spending spree of buying Vegas properties, which included the Frontier next door. He purchased the casino because he was afraid that the toe of the slipper, that faced the window of his Desert Inn penthouse, could contain a photographer taking pictures of him. After several attempts at requesting that the slipper be turned off, Hughes purchased the casino, turned off the lights and had the rotating mechanism dismantled. The Silver Slipper was sealed, so no one could enter.

The casino was purchased for $70 million on June 23, 1988 by Margaret Elardi, who by this time owned the Frontier. It was demolished several months later and turned into a parking lot for the Frontier until its closing and demolition in 2007. There were plans to build an addition to the Frontier on its former grounds; however, they had to eventually be scrapped due to a costly union strike taking place, which put a severe financial strain on the resort.

In 2009, the Silver Slipper sign was restored and is now part of a display of vintage signs in the median along Las Vegas Boulevard North.

References 

Defunct casinos in the Las Vegas Valley
Casinos completed in 1950
1988 disestablishments
Las Vegas Strip
1950 establishments in Nevada